GSK-189,254 is a potent and selective H3 histamine receptor inverse agonist developed by GlaxoSmithKline. It has subnanomolar affinity for the H3 receptor (Ki = 0.2nM) and selectivity of over 10,000x for H3 over other histamine receptor subtypes. Animal studies have shown it to possess not only stimulant and nootropic effects, but also analgesic action suggesting a role for H3 receptors in pain processing in the spinal cord. GSK-189,254 and several other related drugs are currently being investigated as a treatment for Alzheimer's disease and other forms of dementia, as well as possible use in the treatment of conditions such as narcolepsy, or neuropathic pain which do not respond well to conventional analgesic drugs.

References 

Carboxamides
Benzazepanes
GSK plc brands
H3 receptor antagonists
Nootropics
Phenol ethers
Pyridines
Cyclobutyl compounds